Max Sailer (20 December 1882 – 5 February 1964) was a German racecar driver.

Sailer was born in Esslingen. Prior to World War II he headed Mercedes' racing efforts, later retiring to become a technical director of the firm. He died in his native town of Esslingen, aged 81.

Indy 500 results

References

1882 births
1964 deaths
German racing drivers
Indianapolis 500 drivers
People from Esslingen am Neckar
Sportspeople from Stuttgart (region)
Racing drivers from Baden-Württemberg
Mercedes-Benz in Formula One